This is a list of crossings of the River Wear, heading downstream, including road and rail bridges and fords.

Wearhead to Stanhope
 Wearhead Bridge (road)
 Sparks Farm Bridge (road)
 Blackdene Bridge (road)
 Blackdene Mine Bridge (road)
 Coronation Bridge (road)
 Newhouse Pastures Ford (road)
 Bridge End Footbridge (foot)
 Broken Way Footbridge (foot)
 Ponderlane Footbridge (foot)
 Huntshield Ford (road)
 Huntshield Footbridge (foot)
 Daddry Shield bridge, A689 (road)
 Waterside House Footbridge (foot)
 Britton Ford (road)
 Britton Bridge (foot)
 Haswicks Bridge (road)
 Westgate Ford (road)
 Brotherlee Footbridge (foot)
 Eastgate Conveyor Bridge (rail - disused)
 Eastgate Railway Bridge (rail - disused)
 Hag Bridge (road)

Stanhope to Bishop Auckland
 Stanhope West Railway Bridge (rail - disused)
 Stanhope Stone Bridge, B6278 (road, foot?)
 Stanhope Stepping Stones (road, foot)
 Stanhope Footbridge (foot)
 Stanhope Central Railway Bridge (rail - disused)
 Stanhope East Railway Bridge (rail - disused)
 Gas Works Bridge (road)
 Rogerley Railway Bridge (rail)
 Frosterley Bridge (road)
 Kenneth's Bridge (foot)
 Broadwood Rail Bridge (rail)
 Frosterley Ford (road, foot?)
 Broadwood Bridge (road)
 New Bridge, Holebeck Mill (road, foot?)
 Wolsingham Bridge (road, foot?)
 Wolsingham Rail Bridge (rail)
 Harperley Footbridge (foot)
 A68 bridge (road)
 Witton Bridge (road, foot)
 Witton Park Viaduct (rail)
 Witton Park Bridge (foot)
 Ford at Witton Park (road, foot?)

Bishop Auckland to Durham

 Newton Cap/Bishop Skirlaw Bridge (road)
 Newton Cap Viaduct, A689 (road)
 Pay Bridge (foot)
 Jubilee Bridge (road, foot)
 Page Bank Bridge (road)
 , (rail)
 , (road)
 , A167 (road)

Durham to Chester-le-Street

 , A177 (road)
 , (foot)
 , (foot)
 , (road)
 , (road, pedestrianised)
 , (foot)
 , (road, pedestrianised)
 , (road, pedestrianised)
 , A690 (road, foot)
 , (foot)
 , (rail - disused)
 , (rail - disused, now foot but permanently closed)
 , (foot)
 , (road)

Chester-le-Street to Sunderland

 , B1284 (road)
 , A1(M) (motorway)
 , Chester Road A183 (road)
  (road)
 , Lambton estate (private)
 , Lambton estate (private)
 , Washington Highway A182 (road)
  (road)
  (rail - disused)
  (foot)

Sunderland to the North Sea

 Hylton Viaduct, A19 (road)
 Northern Spire Bridge (road, foot)
 Queen Alexandra Bridge, A1231 (road, foot)
 Wearmouth Rail Bridge (rail/Tyne and Wear Metro)
 Wearmouth Bridge, A1018 (road, foot)

 
Wear
Wear